Adila Bayhum-al-Jazairi (1900-1975) was a Syrian feminist. She was a pioneer of the Syrian women's movement.

She was a Co-founder of the Syrian Women's Union in 1924, and served as its President between 1933 and 1967. She was active in supporting women's right to work, to participate in public life and their right to not wear the veil.

References

 Sami M. Moubayed: Steel & Silk: Men and Women who Shaped Syria 1900-2000
 Sami Moubayed: The Makers of Modern Syria: The Rise and Fall of Syrian Democracy 1918-1958
 Sami Moubayed: Under the Black Flag: An Exclusive Insight into the Inner Workings of ISIS
 Fruma Zachs, Sharon Halevi: Gendering Culture in Greater Syria: Intellectuals and Ideology in the Late
 James A. Reilly: Fragile Nation, Shattered Land: The Modern History of Syria
 Ghada Hashem Talhami: Historical Dictionary of Women in the Middle East and North Africa

1900 births
1975 deaths
Syrian feminists
Syrian women's rights activists
20th-century Syrian women